Micropholis suborbicularis is a species of plant in the family Sapotaceae. It is endemic to Venezuela.

References

Flora of Venezuela
suborbicularis
Near threatened plants
Taxonomy articles created by Polbot
Taxa named by André Aubréville